Bayley v Public Trustee [1907] NZGazLawRp 230; (1907) 27 NZLR 659; (1907) 10 GLR 204 is a cited case in New Zealand case law regarding trusts.

References

High Court of New Zealand cases